Events in the year 2021 in Guinea-Bissau.

Incumbents
 President: Umaro Sissoco Embaló 
 Prime Minister: Nuno Gomes Nabiam

Events
Ongoing — COVID-19 pandemic in Guinea-Bissau

Deaths
10 March – Manuel Saturnino da Costa, politician, prime minister (born 1942).
31 March – Carlos Pedro Zilli, 66, Brazilian-born Bissau-Guinean Roman Catholic prelate, bishop of Roman Catholic Diocese of Bafatá (since 2001); COVID-19.

References

 
2020s in Guinea-Bissau
Years of the 21st century in Guinea-Bissau
Guinea-Bissau
Guinea-Bissau